Bhaskar Anand Saletore (1900–1963), better known as B. A. Saletore, was an Indian historian from Mangalore, Karnataka.

Early years
B.A. Saletore was born in village named Saletore in the Puttur taluk of South Canara district (present Dakshina Kannada district). He did his early schooling in Mangalore. He did his B.T. degree from Madras and M.A. degree from St. Xavier's College, Mumbai,(then Bombay). He was educated in London University in History 1931 and also from University of Giessen, Germany in Politics 1933.

Career
He started his career as professor of history at Sir Parshurambhau College in Pune in 1938, and later worked at University of Ahmedabad.  He worked with the Bombay Educational Service. He became the director of National Archives of India, retiring in 1960. Thereafter, he started his tenure as professor, later head of Post Graduate Department of History, and finally director at Kannada Research institute at Karnataka University, Dharwad.

Famous works
Saletore was a polyglot. His works spanning several books and hundreds of articles cover a wide range of subjects including ancient Indian history. During his early years he was guided by world-famous historians like H. Heras and L.D. Barnett.
In the 1930s, he wrote a well-known book Social and Political Life in the Vijayanagara Empire, a book that includes the much debated topic of the origin of the Sangama brothers and the origin of the empire itself. This book was his PhD thesis while at the University of London. The work contains a bibliography of 55 pages, running to thousand and odd books and articles.

Origin of Vijayanagar Empire
Saletore was the first among scholars from Karnataka to emphatically prove the Kannada origin of the empire. He resoundingly argued against a Telugu origin propounded by N. Venkataramanayya with literary and numismatic evidence. While the hour of need during the time of the empire was to ward off Muslim invasion into south India and the people and the administrators of the empire were generally bilingual, Saletore beyond doubt proved that the empire had its origins in Kannada country only. Study on political and social history was divided into
 Revenue administration
 Administration of central government
 Administration of local government
 Law and Justice
 Foreign relations
 Army.

Study on cultural history divided into
 Social institutions
 Position of women
 Social legislation
 Public service
 Habitation, food and dress
 Corporate life
 Festivals, games and amusements.
In appreciation of his work, historian S. Krishnaswamy Aiyangar sums up Saletore's efforts in a nutshell. "The very extent of the subject and the vastness of details available, would baffle in this direction ordinarily. But Dr. Saletore has succeeded in producing a creditable work bearing on the vast subject. The work gives a correct and complete view of the life of the people under the empire, during the three centuries of its fight to preserve Hindu institutions and Hindu civilization".

He is said to be the first historian to use epigraphical sources for the study of social history which is what current days students of history do. He is said to be a pioneer in throwing light on socio-economic polity of Karnataka over the ages. His last book, Ancient Indian Political Thought and Institutions, written just before his death, is said to be a masterpiece. The book is said to be a comparative study of great Indian political minds of ancient times including Kautilya.

Other works
 Ancient Karnataka—History of Tuluva, Poona, 1936
 Medieval Jainism with special reference to the Vijayanagara Empire—Poona, 1938
 Karnataka's Trans-Oceanic Contacts—Dharwar, 1956
 Main Currents in the Ancient History of Gujarat—Baroda, 1960
 India's Diplomatic Relations with the East—Bombay 1960
 The Sthanikas and their Historical Importance B. A. Saletore, Journal Of The University of Bombay, July 1938, Vol VII, Part I (1938), pp29 to pp93
 "Vaishnavism In Vijayanagara, BA Saletore" Published in D. R. Bhandarkar Volume, Indian Research Institute, 1940, p192 to p195

References

External links
Remembering Prof. Saletore
Tribute to Prof. Dr. B.A. Saletore
 https://www.researchgate.net/publication/270363090_Ancient_Indian_Political_Thought_and_Institutions._By_B._A._Saletore._pp._xiv_695._Asia_Publishing_House_Bombay._1963._Rs._30

People from Dakshina Kannada district
1900 births
1963 deaths
Mangaloreans
University of Madras alumni
St. Xavier's College, Mumbai alumni
Alumni of the University of London
University of Giessen alumni
Academic staff of Karnatak University
Historians of India
20th-century Indian historians
Scholars from Mangalore